A wide variety of road signs are displayed in the People's Republic of China.

China's traffic signs also closely followed those used in Europe,
the US, and Japan.

The signs are specified in the Guobiao standard GB 5678-2009, and the Vienna Convention on Road Signs and Signals is banned in China.

The road signs used in the special administrative regions of Hong Kong and Macau differ from those used in the rest of China.

Gallery

Warning signs

Prohibitory signs

Indicative signs

Informational signs

Tourist signs

Additional signs

Vehicle-mounted signs

Retired signs

References 

China
Road transport in China